Richard Cleaver  (16 August 1917 – 25 October 2006) was an Australian politician. Born in Perth, Western Australia, he was educated at Perth Modern School before becoming a chartered secretary and accountant, and then a management consultant. He served in the military 1941–1946.

In 1955, he was elected to the Australian House of Representatives as the Liberal member for Swan, and held the seat until his defeat in 1969. Cleaver died in 2006, at St John of God Hospital Hospice in Murdoch, Western Australia.

References

1917 births
2006 deaths
Liberal Party of Australia members of the Parliament of Australia
Members of the Australian House of Representatives for Swan
Members of the Australian House of Representatives
People educated at Perth Modern School
Australian Commanders of the Order of the British Empire
Members of the Order of Australia
20th-century Australian politicians